Maria Beatriz Parpinelli Seidl (born 19 September 1961) is a Brazilian actress.

Career 

On television, she took roles in notable telenovelas and miniseries as Paraíso, Louco Amor, Dona Beija, Mandala, Vale Tudo, Vamp, Engraçadinha... Seus Amores e Seus Pecados, Memorial de Maria Moura, Alma Gêmea and Insensato Coração. but she is best remembered by the performance as the bitchy and envious Gláucia in A Gata Comeu, one of her greatest hits.

Seidl was revealed on the Silvio de Abreu's telenovela Jogo da Vida.

Vera, her character in Malhação, discovered a breast cancer and was undergoing a radical mastectomy (choosing, a courageous decision not to reconstruct the breast lost).

In theater, she portrayed the protagonist on Bernard Shaw's play Candida.

In 2007 she made a cameo in the telenovela Duas Caras. In 2008, she was in two episodes of Casos e Acasos.

In 2009, she was cast in the microseries Deu a Louca no Tempo. In the same year, she took part in the remake Paraíso. The actress had been cast in the first version of this telenovela, in 1982.

In 2010 the actress participated in the series A Vida Alheia. In the following year, she took part in the telenovela Insensato Coração. In 2012, she was in Lado a Lado, playing Margarida.

In 2017, Bia Seidl signs with RecordTV to play Débora, one of the main characters in Apocalipse.

Personal life 

She married the singer Ronnie Von in 1984. They broke up some time later.

Bia Seidl has two children: Miranda, with actor Sérgio Mastropasqua, and the theater producer Daniel.

Filmography

Television

Film

References

External links 

1961 births
Living people
Actresses from Rio de Janeiro (city)
Brazilian television actresses
Brazilian telenovela actresses
Brazilian film actresses
Brazilian stage actresses